Richard Lecomte (born 30 March 1964) is a retired French football midfielder.

References

1964 births
Living people
French footballers
FC Rouen players
En Avant Guingamp players
Amiens SC players
Association football midfielders
Ligue 1 players
Ligue 2 players